Peter James Mather (born 21 July 1960) is a British businessman, and the Head of BP in the UK. BP employs around 15,000 people in the UK.

Early life
He was born in Bristol and attended an independent school there. His parents were both doctors. He went to New College, Oxford, graduating in 1982. He studied modern languages (French and German) and philosophy. In 1991, he studied at INSEAD in France.

Career
In 1997 he became Managing Director of BP Gas. In January 2004 he became Head of BP in the UK. In April 2010 he became Head of BP in Europe.

He works with Business in the Community.

Personal life
He can speak French, German and Spanish fluently. He speaks some Russian. He is married with three children (with a daughter born December 1997). He married Vivienne Creevey in April 1985 in Oxford. He lives in Richmond Hill, London. His wife published a children's book in French in 2006.

References

External links
 Discussion at Blavatnik School of Government in Oxford in 2014

1960 births
Alumni of New College, Oxford
BP people
British businesspeople in the oil industry
INSEAD alumni
Businesspeople from Bristol
Living people
Fellows of King's College London